Can Jubany is a Catalan restaurant in Calldetenes, Catalonia. Chef Nandu Jubany raises vegetables, herbs, and livestock for his refined versions of  traditional Catalan cuisine.

See also
Local food

References

External links
Official website

Michelin Guide starred restaurants in Spain
Catalan cuisine
Restaurants in Catalonia
Osona